Fredrik Krogstad (born 6 June 1995) is a Norwegian football midfielder who currently plays for Stabæk.

He played youth football for Vestli, Lyn and Lørenskog. In 2013, he made his senior debut for Lørenskog, and signed with Lillestrøm ahead of the 2015 season. He made his first-team debut in April 2015 against Start.

He spent the first half of the 2016 season on loan in Ullensaker/Kisa IL.

References

1995 births
Living people
Footballers from Oslo
Norwegian footballers
Lillestrøm SK players
Eliteserien players
Ullensaker/Kisa IL players
Norwegian First Division players

Association football midfielders